Royal Eijsbouts is a bell foundry located in Asten, Netherlands.

The workshop was founded in 1872 by Bonaventura Eijsbouts as a "factory for tower clocks." In 1893 Eijsbouts was joined by his 15-year-old son, Johan, and the workshop expanded to begin supplying striking and swinging bells, which were cast at other foundries, with their clocks.

As interest in carillons increased, Johan Eijsbouts purchased bells from two English foundries, John Taylor Bellfounders and Gillett & Johnston, and installed them in carillons.

In 1924, Johan's oldest son, Tuur Eijsbouts, joined the company. Tuur was technically minded and inventive. He took the initiative to learn how to cast bells himself. After years of experimentation, an in-house bell foundry was installed in 1947.

The company is still recognized for their cast bells, which are used in carillons and church bells. In 2006 Eijsbouts cast the largest swinging bell in the world.

Royal Eijsbouts has been involved in extensive research programs in campanology (the scientific and musical study of bells) for decades. Those efforts have resulted in computer applications with which all aspects of bell sound and bell shape can be accurately calculated.

Besides bell casting, Royal Eijsbouts also manufactures custom made tower clocks and astronomical clocks of any size. They also operate an art foundry, using several techniques to cast sculptures and statues.

In 2014 Notre Dame celebrated its 850th anniversary. On this occasion, it was decided to restore the bells of the cathedral to its former glory with a new set of bells. The order was given to the French foundry Cornille-Havard and Royal Eijsbouts in Asten, where the largest bell (Marie) was produced. The casting of Marie took place in Asten on September 14, 2012, in the presence of the bishops of 's-Hertogenbosch, Hasselt and the archbishop of Paris. After inspection, the 6 ton heavy bell was put in a special truck to Paris. Cardinal André Vingt-Trois, archbishop of Paris, dedicated on February 2, 2013, all newly cast bells that were exhibited until February 25 in the cathedral. The day after, the new bells were hung in the belfries. On March 23, thirty thousand listeners followed the first loud creations the renewed sound of Notre Dame.

Also in 2014 Royal Eijsbouts acquired bell foundry Petit & Fritsen in Aarle-Rixtel, their last Dutch competitor. Foundry activities in Aarle-Rixtel were terminated and re-allocated to Asten.

References

External links

 
 St. John Cantius website

Bell foundries
Carillon makers
Dutch companies established in 1872
Manufacturing companies established in 1872
Musical instrument manufacturing companies of the Netherlands